Yuval Shany is an Israel academic.  He holds the Hersch Lauterpacht Chair in Public International Law at Hebrew University.  An expert on humanitarian law and human rights,  in 2018 Shany was elected Chair of the United Nations Human Rights Committee, a committee of scholars who review compliance of member states with the International Covenant on Civil and Political Rights.  As of 2018, he is deputy president of the Israel Democracy Institute.

Shany holds an LLB from the Hebrew University of Jerusalem (1995), an LLM in International Legal Studies from New York University (1997), and a PhD in International Law from the SOAS, University of London (2001).

References

Living people
Year of birth missing (living people)
Place of birth missing (living people)
Academic staff of the Hebrew University of Jerusalem
United Nations Human Rights Committee members
Israeli legal scholars
Hebrew University of Jerusalem Faculty of Law alumni
New York University alumni
Alumni of SOAS University of London
Israeli officials of the United Nations
Members of the Institut de Droit International